Gorenji Mačkovec is a remote abandoned former settlement in the Municipality of Kočevje in southern Slovenia. The area is part of the traditional region of Lower Carniola and is now included in the Southeast Slovenia Statistical Region. Its territory is now part of the village of Laze pri Oneku.

History
Gorenji Mačkovec was a village inhabited by Gottschee Germans. It had two houses before the Second World War. The village was burned by Italian troops during the Rog Offensive in August 1942 and was not rebuilt after the war.

References

External links
Gorenji Mačkovec (Gornji Mačkovec) on Geopedia
Pre–World War II map of Gorenji Mačkovec with oeconyms and family names

Former populated places in the Municipality of Kočevje